Bovey Castle is a large early 20th-century mansion on the edge of Dartmoor National Park, near Moretonhampstead, Devon, England. It is a Grade II* listed building  
and is now a hotel with 59 individually designed bedrooms in the hotel and 22 three-storey country lodges nearby.

History

The house was built in 1907 to designs by Detmar Blow, for Frederick Smith (the son and heir of the Conservative politician and stationery magnate William Henry Smith).

By 1930 it had become a hotel operated by the Great Western Railway, known as the Manor House Hotel.  In 1948 it was taken over by the British Transport Commission. Expanded under new ownership in the 1990s, the castle was purchased and refurbished by the entrepreneur Peter de Savary in 2003 and renamed 'Bovey Castle'.

In 2006 de Savary sold Bovey Castle to Hilwood Resorts.  In 2014 it was sold to The Rigby Group plc as part of their Eden Hotel Collection.

Architecture

The main building was built in 1907 in Jacobean style, with a Great Hall into which a floor was inserted in the 1980s.  The interior is of high quality, with panelled rooms and elaborately carved features.  Extensions were built in the 1930s.  The garden front is set above terraces overlooking a lake and the River Bovey.

Golf

The hotel estate includes an 18-hole championship golf course that was designed by John Frederick Abercromby in 1926.

References

Country houses in Devon
Hotels in Devon
Grade II* listed buildings in Devon
Grade II* listed houses
Houses completed in 1907
Country house hotels
Golf clubs and courses in Devon